A number of ships have been named SS Patroclus after Patroclus, the Ancient Greek hero Achilles' best friend.

 , a 2,074-ton ship of the Blue Funnel Line
 , a 5,509-ton ship of the Blue Funnel Line
 , a 10,109-ton ship of the Blue Funnel Line

Ship names